Herbert Fineman (July 4, 1920 – August 18, 2016) was an American politician and former Speaker of the Pennsylvania House of Representatives.

Fineman from Wynnefield was first elected to the Pennsylvania House of Representatives in 1955 from the 194th District. Before being elected Speaker, he was the floor leader for the Democratic party in the Pennsylvania House.

He was convicted on charges of accepting payments from parents trying to get their children into graduate schools at state-supported universities. (1977)

He died on August 18, 2016.

References

Members of the Pennsylvania House of Representatives
Speakers of the Pennsylvania House of Representatives
1920 births
2016 deaths
Pennsylvania politicians convicted of crimes